Sarmie may refer to:

 Sarmi, Nepal, a village
 sarmie, a South African English word for "sandwich"

See also 
 Sarmi (disambiguation)